Terentyevskaya is a rural locality (a village) in Chushevitskoye Rural Settlement, Verkhovazhsky District, Vologda Oblast, Russia. The population was 44 as of 2002.

Geography 
Terentyevskaya is located 41 km south of Verkhovazhye (the district's administrative centre) by road. Velikodvorskaya is the nearest rural locality.

References 

Rural localities in Verkhovazhsky District